Oskar Schwerk (born July 16, 1869 in Hünern, Trebnitz district ; died November 14, 1950 ) was a German Generalmajor and SS-Obergruppenfuhrer.

World War I
Oskar Schwerk was the son of a pastor and attended the Elisabet Gymnasium in Breslau. On October 15, 1887 he joined the 3rd Lower Silesian Infantry Regiment No. 50 of the Prussian Army in Rawitsch as a cadet. On January 15, 1889, he was promoted to second lieutenant. On January 27, 1896, he was promoted to first lieutenant and soon promoted again to regimental adjutant. On April 1, 1897, Schwerk was transferred to the 154th Infantry Regiment in Jauer and became the adjutant. On September 12, 1902, he was promoted to Hauptmann (captain) with the 31st Infantry Brigade in Trier. On January 27, 1905, he was appointed company commander in the Infantry Regiment "Herwarth von Bittenfeld" (1st Westphalian) No. 13 in Münster. Schwerk was soon promoted to major and became the adjutant of the 2nd Division in Insterburg on February 21, 1911. He held this position for the next three years and was made commander of the III on March 22, 1914. 

Went the outbreak of World War I, Schwerk fought with this regiment in Neufchâteau, France. He took part in the battles at Varennes-en-Argonne, Fleury-devant-Douaumont and Reims. On November 12, 1914, Schwerk became commander of the 4th Lower Silesian Infantry Regiment No. 51 and took part with the 11th Division in the Winter First Battle of Champagne, then join the First Battle of Artois, then the Battle of La Bassée and Battle of Arras. In 1917 he transferred to trench warfare near the Battle of the Somme and Frize. On January 27, 1916, Schwerk was promoted to Oberstleutnant (lieutenant colonel) and took part in the Battle of the Somme, and was awarded the Prussian bravery award, the Pour le Mérite on September 21, 1916.

In the spring of 1917, Schwerk and his regiment were engaged in heavy defensive fighting in the Tilloy-lès-Mofflaines, Pas-de-Calais sector. In the Battle of Arras] Schwerk was wounded by British artillery fire on April 10, 1917. His left leg was amputated. For his personal commitment, he was awarded the Pour le Mérite Oak Leaves on May 2, 1917, as a first regiment commander. After his recovery he was appointed inspector of the military penal institutions on January 18, 1918, and promoted to Oberst (colonel) on July 15, 1918. In September 1918 he was appointed as commander of Berlin.

Interwar period
With the end of the German Empire and the start of the German Republic, on November 9, 1918, Schwerk stepped down and his successor was Otto Wels. Schwerk was transferred to Breslau and appointed inspector of the local militia Landwehr inspection and was head of the Sicherheitspolize (security police) in Silesia, Poland. He retired from active military service on January 31, 1920. In retirement, Schwerk became the chairman of the officers' association of the former 4th Lower Silesian Infantry Regiment No. 51 and leader of the Provincial Warriors' Association for Silesia. He also became a leader in the Sturmabteilung (SA) Reserve II in Silesia, and was promoted to the rank of Standartenfuhrer.

World War 2
Schwerk joined the Nazi Party in May 1937 (membership number 5,420,196) and became a member of the Schutzstaffel (SS number 276,825). He was promoted through the ranks, reaching the rank of SS-Obergruppenfuhrer on July 16, 1944. He also was the Regional Leader of the Southeast Nationalsocialist Reich Warriors Association, (NS-Reichskriegerbund) and also the Gaufuhrer for the Southeast Reichskriegerbund in the city of Wrocław.

Ranks
Ranks and dates
    SS-Obergruppenführer: 1 September 1944
    SS-Gruppenführer: 9 November 1942
    "Charakter" (honorary title) of Generalmajor a.D.: 27 August 1939
    SS-Brigadeführer: 20 April 1939
    SS-Oberführer: 20 April 1937
    SS-Standartenführer: 13 September 1936
    Oberst: 15 July 1918
    Oberstleutnant: 27 January 1916
    Major: 21 February 1911
    Hauptmann: 12 September 1902
    Premierleutnant: 1 September 1896 - 27 januari 1886
    Sekondeleutnant: 15 January 1889
    Fahnenjunker: 15 October 1887

Awards
Pour le Mérite Oak Leaves
 Tannenbergtag Awards as Character of Major General on August 27, 1939

See also 
Register of SS leaders in general's rank

References

1869 births
1950 deaths
SS-Obergruppenführer
German Army personnel of World War I
German people of World War II
SS and Police Leaders
Recipients of the Pour le Mérite (military class)